Oakland High School (OHS) is located in Murfreesboro, Tennessee, U.S. It has approximately 2,300 students. OHS is part of the fourth largest school system in the state. OHS serves eastern Murfreesboro and the rural areas of northeastern and eastern Rutherford County, including Lascassas, Milton, and Kittrell.

History
OHS opened in 1972 along with its sister school Riverdale High School(RHS).  These schools have the oldest rivalry in the county, as they were the first 2 schools built after Central High School. This rivalry was intensified by fierce competition in football and basketball. While RHS remains OHS's biggest rival, Siegel High School is a close second. The school's principal, Bill Spurlock, was assigned the role of Director of Schools in June 2018 after 10 years of service. He was replaced by John Marshall in August 2018.

Mechatronics
OHS offers an award-winning Mechatronics program in partnership with Motlow State Community College.  This programs allows students to earn a Mechatronics Associate degree while attending OHS. Additionally, students can earn multiple certifications, including a Solidworks CSWA certification, a FANUC certification, and a Level 1 Siemens Certification.  Students can earn a Level 2 Siemens certification if they decide to go down the full Mechatronics ASS path. 

The school won Tennessee's 2017 Excellence in action, Manufacturing award for its Mechatronics and automotive technology programs.  In 2017, Betsy DeVos visited the school to commemorate this achievement.

Leonard Ciletti has led the Mechatronics program since its inception.

Curriculum

Since 2007, Oakland High School has offered the IB Diploma Programme.

Notable alumni
 Bayer Mack, writer, record executive, and film producer
 Chris Young, country music singer
 Robert J. Schwalb, (writer), Sci-Fi/Fantasy Author, Game Designer
 JaCoby Stevens, American football safety
 Bryan M. Clayton - businessman and real estate investor, CEO and cofounder of GreenPal
 Stephen McAdoo, NFL/CFL player with the Cleveland Browns and Shreveport Pirates, CFL Coach, currently offensive line coach for the Toronto Argonauts

References

External links
Oakland High School website

Educational institutions established in 1972
Public high schools in Tennessee
International Baccalaureate schools in Tennessee
Buildings and structures in Murfreesboro, Tennessee
Schools in Rutherford County, Tennessee